Eduardo da Silva Escobar (born 25 February 1983), known as Edu, is a Brazilian footballer who plays as a forward. His last team was JCT FC in the I-League.

References

1983 births
Living people
I-League players
Association football forwards
Brazilian footballers
JCT FC players
People from Campo Grande
Sportspeople from Mato Grosso do Sul